The Fernando Formation is a Pliocene stratigraphic unit in California. Outcrops of the formation in Santa Monica Mountains National Recreation Area have produced fossil shark teeth.

Footnotes

References
 Hunt, ReBecca K., Vincent L. Santucci and Jason Kenworthy. 2006. "A preliminary inventory of fossil fish from National Park Service units." in S.G. Lucas, J.A. Spielmann, P.M. Hester, J.P. Kenworthy, and V.L. Santucci (ed.s), Fossils from Federal Lands. New Mexico Museum of Natural History and Science Bulletin 34, pp. 63–69.

Geologic formations of California